Pretty Paper is a Christmas novel co-written by Willie Nelson and David Ritz. The book presents a fictional account about the life of the street vendor who inspired the song of the same name.

Overview
In 1963, Nelson wrote the song "Pretty Paper", inspired by a street vendor he often saw in Fort Worth, Texas during the Christmas season that sold pencils on the door of a department store. The song was later made famous by Roy Orbison, while Nelson recorded his own version in 1979.

Published on October 25, 2016 by Blue Rider Press, the book was co-authored by David Ritz. In the fictional account, Nelson decides to learn more about the man, who he learns to be a fellow musician. The man by the name of Vernon Clay initially resists his inquires, eventually later showing Nelson his proficiency on the guitar and singing.

References

Books by Willie Nelson
2016 American novels
Collaborative novels
Christmas novels
Blue Rider Press books